Elk Mountain is in the northern Teton Range, Grand Teton National Park, Wyoming. North of Elk Mountain, the Tetons blend into the Yellowstone Plateau.

References

Mountains of Grand Teton National Park
Mountains of Wyoming
Mountains of Teton County, Wyoming